Trimeresurus insularis or Indonesian pit viper, Lesser Sunda Islands pit viper, Sunda white-lipped pit viper is a venomous pit viper species found in eastern Java and the Lesser Sunda Islands, Indonesia.

Description
The scalation includes 21 rows of dorsal scales at midbody, 156–164/156–167 ventral scales in males/females, 70–75/54–59 subcaudal scales in males/females, and 7–12 supralabial scales. Their color patterns are often found to be green or a blue-green color with specific populations even containing yellow variants as well.

Geographic range
It is found in Indonesia on eastern Java, Adonara, Alor, Bali, Flores, Komodo, Lombok, Padar, Rinca, Romang, Roti, Sumba, Sumbawa, Timor, and Wetar and East Timor. The type locality given is "Soe, Timor".

References

Further reading
 Kramer, E. 1977. Zur Schlangenfauna Nepals. Rev. suisse Zool. 84 (3): 721–761. (Trimeresurus albolabris insularis, p. 755.)

insularis
Snakes of Asia
Reptiles of Indonesia
Reptiles of Timor
Reptiles described in 1977